The Kuril–Kamchatka Trench or Kuril Trench (Kurilo-Kamchatskii Zhyolob) is an oceanic trench in the northwest Pacific Ocean. It lies off the southeast coast of Kamchatka and parallels the Kuril Island chain to meet the Japan Trench east of Hokkaido. It extends from a triple junction with the Ulakhan Fault and the Aleutian Trench near the Commander Islands, Russia, in the northeast, to the intersection with the Japan Trench in the southwest.

The trench formed as a result of the subduction zone, which formed in the late Cretaceous, that created the Kuril island arc as well as the Kamchatka volcanic arc.  The Pacific Plate is being subducted beneath the Okhotsk Plate along the trench, resulting in intense volcanism.

The maximum depth of the trench is reported in peer-reviewded academic papers as 9,600 meters.

Tectonics

At the Kuril-Kamchatka Trench, the Pacific Plate is subducting beneath the Okhotsk Plate, a microplate formerly considered to be part of the North American Plate. The convergence rate ranges from ≈/yr in the north to ≈/yr at the southern end. Obliquity of convergence increases to the south, where the transpressional stress is partitioned into trench-normal thrust earthquakes and trench-parallel strike-slip earthquakes. This partitioning results in westward translation of the Kurile forearc relative to the North American Plate.

Associated seismicity 
Major earthquakes associated with the subduction zone:

References

External links
 Kamchatka & Kuril Islands: Regional Map and Introduction, www.skimountaineer.com, accessed 25 October 2022

Landforms of Asia
Landforms of the Kuril Islands
Kamchatka Peninsula
Oceanic trenches of the Pacific Ocean
Subduction zones
Landforms of Russia
Landforms of Sakhalin Oblast
Geology of the Russian Far East